Leende guldbruna ögon may refer to:

"Leende guldbruna ögon", Swedish language-version of the song "Beautiful Brown Eyes"
Leende guldbruna ögon (TV series), a Swedish TV series
Leende guldbruna ögon (soundtrack album), soundtrack for the TV series